The 2015 Monterrey Challenger was a professional tennis tournament played on hard courts. It was the sixth edition of the tournament which was part of the 2015 ATP Challenger Tour. It took place in Monterrey, Mexico from 26 to 31 of October 2015.

Singles main-draw entrants

Seeds

 1 Rankings are as of October 19, 2015.

Other entrants
The following players received wildcards into the singles main draw:
  Taylor Harry Fritz
  Tigre Hank 
  Manuel Sánchez 
  Hans Hach Verdugo

The following player entered the singles main draw with a protected ranking:
  Dennis Nevolo

The following player entered the main draw as an alternate:
  Ernesto Escobedo

The following players received entry from the qualifying draw:
  Luis Eduardo Morfin Friebel
  Luis Patiño
  Alexandre Tsuchiya
  Kaichi Uchida

Champions

Singles

 Thiemo de Bakker def.  Víctor Estrella Burgos 7–6(7–1), 4–6, 6–3

Doubles

 Thiemo de Bakker /  Mark Vervoort def.  Paolo Lorenzi /  Fernando Romboli by walkover.

External links
Official Website

2015 in Mexican tennis
Monterrey Challenger